Attorney General Preston may refer to:

Douglas A. Preston (1858–1929), Attorney General of Wyoming
Edward Preston (1831–1890), Attorney General of the Kingdom of Hawaii
Isaac Trimble Preston (1793–1852), Attorney General of Louisiana

See also
General Preston (disambiguation)